George Williamson (1898 - 8 September 1968) was professor of English, from 1940, at the University of Chicago where he worked from 1936 to 1968. He specialized in the English metaphysical poets.

Selected publications
Williamson's works include:
 The Talent of T. S. Eliot ("University of Washington Chapbooks," No. 32.) Seattle: University of Washington Bookstore, 1929. 
 The Donne Tradition. Cambridge, Mass.: Harvard University Press, 1930.
 The Senecan Amble: A Study in Prose Form from Bacon to Collier. London: Faber & Faber; Chicago: University of Chicago Press, 1951.
 A Reader's Guide to T. S. Eliot: A Poem-by- Poem Analysis. New York: Noonday Press, 1953.
 Seventeenth-Century Contexts. London: Faber & Faber, 1960. 
 The Proper Wit of Poetry. London: Faber & Faber; Chicago: University of Chicago Press, 1961.
 A Reader's Guide to the Metaphysical Poets. London: Thames & Hudson, 1968.

References 

1898 births
1968 deaths
American academics of English literature
University of Chicago faculty